Dinos Katsouridis (1927 - 28 November 2011) was a Greek Cypriot film director, cinematographer and editor. He had worked in a lot of Greek film sometimes as director, sometimes as film editor and sometimes as cinematographer as well as writer. He has won film awards about all the categories of these works

Biography
He was born in Nicosia in 1927. He started to study Law Studies but he forsaked them in order to deal with cinema. Since 1960, he started to work as film director. His first films as director was the films Englima sta Paraskinia and Eimai Athoos. In 1963, he directed two successful comedies with Kostas Hatzichristos in Leading role, the films Tis Kakomoiras and O Kyrios Pterarchos. Since 1970, he directed movies that starred Thanasis Veggos. He has won four awards in Thessaloniki Film Festival in categories Best Film, Best Screenplay and Best Cinematography.

Filmography
As Director
Englima sta Paraskinia 1960 
Eimai Athoos 1960 
O Kyrios Pterarchos 1963 
Tis Kakomoiras  1963
Adistaktoi  1965
Syntomo dialeimma  1966
O Thanasis, i Ioulietta kai ta loukanika  1970
Enas Vengos gia oles tis douleies  1970
What Did You Do in the War, Thanasi?  1971
Thanasi, pare t' oplo sou  1972
O Thanasis sti hora tis sfaliaras  1976
O palavos kosmos tou Thanasi  1979
O falakros mathitis  1979
Vengos, o trellos kamikazi  1980
O Thanasis kai to katarameno fidi  1982
Oneiro aristeris nyhtas  1987

Awards

References

External links

1927 births
2011 deaths
Greek film directors
Greek cinematographers
People from Nicosia